CarolAndrea Kevichüsa (born 18 February 2001) is an Indian model and actress from Nagaland. She made her acting debut with Anek in 2022 alongside Ayushmann Khurrana.

Early life 
CarolAndrea Kevichüsa was born on 18 February 2001 in Kohima, Nagaland. Her father is Angami Naga from Khonoma, and also has Mizo ancestry. Her mother is Ao Naga. Kevichüsa did her schooling from Little Flower Higher Secondary School in Kohima.

Career 
Kevichüsa started modelling in 2016 at age 15 after she was scouted by her agency.

Kevichüsa has worked with fashion designers like Sabyasachi Mukherjee and several other notable brands. She has also worked for Katrina Kaif’s cosmetic line, Kay Beauty and has been featured in editorials of magazines such as Vogue India, Harper's Bazaar, Elle, Femina, Grazia and on the cover of Filmfare.

In 2022, Kevichüsa made her film debut with Anek. The film is written and directed by Anubhav Sinha. Kevichüsa plays the role of a North East Indian boxer.

Filmography

References

External links 
 
 
 Andrea Kevichüsa on Anima Creatives

2001 births
Living people
Indian film actresses
Naga people
People from Kohima